The United Nations (UN), particularly informally also referred to as the United Nations Organization (UNO), is an intergovernmental organization whose stated purposes are to maintain international peace and security, develop friendly relations among nations, achieve international cooperation, and be a centre for harmonizing the actions of nations. It is the world's largest and most familiar international organization. The UN is headquartered on international territory in New York City, and has other main offices in Geneva, Nairobi, Vienna, and The Hague (home to the International Court of Justice).

The UN was established after World War II with the aim of preventing future world wars, succeeding the League of Nations, which was characterized as ineffective. On 25 April 1945, 50 governments met in San Francisco for a conference and started drafting the UN Charter, which was adopted on 25 June 1945 and took effect on 24 October 1945, when the UN began operations. Pursuant to the Charter, the organization's objectives include maintaining international peace and security, protecting human rights, delivering humanitarian aid, promoting sustainable development, and upholding international law. At its founding, the UN had 51 member states; with the addition of South Sudan in 2011, membership is now 193, representing almost all of the world's sovereign states.

The organization's mission to preserve world peace was complicated in its early decades by the Cold War between the United States and Soviet Union and their respective allies. Its missions have consisted primarily of unarmed military observers and lightly armed troops with primarily monitoring, reporting and confidence-building roles. UN membership grew significantly following widespread decolonization beginning in the 1960s. Since then, 80 former colonies have gained independence, including 11 trust territories that had been monitored by the Trusteeship Council. By the 1970s, the UN's budget for economic and social development programmes far outstripped its spending on peacekeeping. After the end of the Cold War, the UN shifted and expanded its field operations, undertaking a wide variety of complex tasks.

The UN has six principal organs: the General Assembly; the Security Council; the Economic and Social Council (ECOSOC); the Trusteeship Council; the International Court of Justice; and the UN Secretariat. The UN System includes a multitude of specialized agencies, funds and programmes such as the World Bank Group, the World Health Organization, the World Food Programme, UNESCO, and UNICEF. Additionally, non-governmental organizations may be granted consultative status with ECOSOC and other agencies to participate in the UN's work.

The UN's chief administrative officer is the secretary-general, currently Portuguese politician and diplomat António Guterres, who began his first five year-term on 1 January 2017 and was re-elected on 8 June 2021. The organization is financed by assessed and voluntary contributions from its member states.

The UN, its officers, and its agencies have won many Nobel Peace Prizes, though other evaluations of its effectiveness have been mixed. Some commentators believe the organization to be an important force for peace and human development, while others have called it ineffective, biased, or corrupt.

History

Background (pre-1941) 

In the century prior to the UN's creation, several international organizations such as the International Committee of the Red Cross were formed to ensure protection and assistance for victims of armed conflict and strife.

During World War I, several major leaders, especially US President Woodrow Wilson, advocated for a world body to guarantee peace. The winners of the war, the Allies, met to hammer out formal peace terms at the Paris Peace Conference. The League of Nations was approved, and started operations, but the U.S. never joined. On 10 January 1920, the League of Nations formally came into being when the Covenant of the League of Nations, ratified by 42 nations in 1919, took effect. The League Council acted as a type of executive body directing the Assembly's business. It began with four permanent members—the United Kingdom, France, Italy, and Japan.

After some limited successes and failures during the 1920s, the League proved ineffective in the 1930s. It failed to act against the Japanese invasion of Manchuria in 1933. Forty nations voted for Japan to withdraw from Manchuria but Japan voted against it and walked out of the League instead of withdrawing from Manchuria. It also failed against the Second Italo-Ethiopian War when calls for economic sanctions against Italy failed. Italy and other nations left the league. All of them realized that it had failed and they began to re-arm as fast as possible.

When war broke out in 1939, the League closed down.

Declarations by the Allies of World War II (1941–1944) 

The first specific step towards the establishment of the United Nations was the Inter-Allied conference that led to the Declaration of St James's Palace on 12 June 1941. By August 1941, American president Franklin Roosevelt and British prime minister Winston Churchill had drafted the Atlantic Charter to define goals for the post-war world. At the subsequent meeting of the Inter-Allied Council in London on 24 September 1941, the eight governments in exile of countries under Axis occupation, together with the Soviet Union and representatives of the Free French Forces, unanimously adopted adherence to the common principles of policy set forth by Britain and United States.

President Roosevelt and Prime Minister Churchill met at the White House in December 1941 for the Arcadia Conference. Roosevelt, considered a founder of the UN, coined the term United Nations to describe the Allied countries. Churchill accepted it, noting its use by Lord Byron. The text of the Declaration by United Nations was drafted on 29 December 1941, by Roosevelt, Churchill, and Roosevelt aide Harry Hopkins. It incorporated Soviet suggestions but included no role for France. One major change from the Atlantic Charter was the addition of a provision for religious freedom, which Stalin approved after Roosevelt insisted.

Roosevelt's idea of the "Four Powers", referring to the four major Allied countries, the United States, United Kingdom, Soviet Union, and Republic of China, emerged in the Declaration by United Nations. On New Year's Day 1942, President Roosevelt, Prime Minister Churchill, Maxim Litvinov, of the USSR, and T. V. Soong, of China, signed the "Declaration by United Nations", and the next day the representatives of twenty-two other nations added their signatures. During the war, "the United Nations" became the official term for the Allies. To join, countries had to sign the Declaration and declare war on the Axis powers.

The October 1943 Moscow Conference resulted in the Moscow Declarations, including the Four Power Declaration on General Security which aimed for the creation "at the earliest possible date of a general international organization". This was the first public announcement that a new international organization was being contemplated to replace the League of Nations. The Tehran Conference followed shortly afterwards at which Roosevelt, Churchill and Stalin met and discussed the idea of a post-war international organization.

The new international organization was formulated and negotiated among the delegations from the Allied Big Four at the Dumbarton Oaks Conference from 21 September to 7 October 1944. They agreed on proposals for the aims, structure and functioning of the new international organization. It took the conference at Yalta in February 1945, and further negotiations with Moscow, before all the issues were resolved.

Founding (1945)

By 1 March 1945, 21 additional states had signed the Declaration by United Nations. After months of planning, the UN Conference on International Organization opened in San Francisco, 25 April 1945, attended by 50 governments and a number of non-governmental organizations. The Big Four sponsoring countries invited other nations to take part and the heads of the delegations of the four chaired the plenary meetings. Winston Churchill urged Roosevelt to restore France to its status of a major Power after the liberation of Paris in August 1944. The drafting of the Charter of the United Nations was completed over the following two months; it was signed on 26 June 1945 by the representatives of the 50 countries. Jan Smuts was a principal author of the draft. The UN officially came into existence on 24 October 1945, upon ratification of the Charter by the five permanent members of the Security Council—the US, the UK, France, the Soviet Union and the Republic of China—and by a majority of the other 46 signatories.

The first meetings of the General Assembly, with 51 nations represented, and the Security Council took place in London beginning in January 1946. Debates began at once, covering topical issues such as the presence of Russian troops in Iranian Azerbaijan, British forces in Greece and within days the first veto was cast. British diplomat Gladwyn Jebb served as acting secretary-general.

The General Assembly selected New York City as the site for the headquarters of the UN, construction began on 14 September 1948 and the facility was completed on 9 October 1952. Its site—like UN headquarters buildings in Geneva, Vienna, and Nairobi—is designated as international territory. The Norwegian foreign minister, Trygve Lie, was elected as the first UN secretary-general.

Cold War (1947–1991)

Though the UN's primary mandate was peacekeeping, the division between the US and USSR often paralysed the organization, generally allowing it to intervene only in conflicts distant from the Cold War. Two notable exceptions were a Security Council resolution on 7 July 1950 authorizing a US-led coalition to repel the North Korean invasion of South Korea, passed in the absence of the USSR, and the signing of the Korean Armistice Agreement on 27 July 1953.

On 29 November 1947, the General Assembly approved a resolution to partition Palestine, approving the creation of the state of Israel. Two years later, Ralph Bunche, a UN official, negotiated an armistice to the resulting conflict. On 7 November 1956, the first UN peacekeeping force was established to end the Suez Crisis; however, the UN was unable to intervene against the USSR's simultaneous invasion of Hungary following that country's revolution.

On 14 July 1960, the UN established United Nations Operation in the Congo (UNOC), the largest military force of its early decades, to bring order to the breakaway State of Katanga, restoring it to the control of the Democratic Republic of the Congo by 11 May 1964. While traveling to meet rebel leader Moise Tshombe during the conflict, Dag Hammarskjöld, often named as one of the UN's most effective secretaries-general, died in a plane crash; months later he was posthumously awarded the Nobel Peace Prize. In 1964, Hammarskjöld's successor, U Thant, deployed the UN Peacekeeping Force in Cyprus, which would become one of the UN's longest-running peacekeeping missions.

With the spread of decolonization in the 1960s, the organization's membership saw an influx of newly independent nations. In 1960 alone, 17 new states joined the UN, 16 of them from Africa. On 25 October 1971, with opposition from the United States, but with the support of many Third World nations, the mainland, communist People's Republic of China was given the Chinese seat on the Security Council in place of the Republic of China; the vote was widely seen as a sign of waning US influence in the organization. Third World nations organized into the Group of 77 coalition under the leadership of Algeria, which briefly became a dominant power at the UN. On 10 November 1975, a bloc comprising the USSR and Third World nations passed a resolution, over the strenuous US and Israeli opposition, declaring Zionism to be racism; the resolution was repealed on 16 December 1991, shortly after the end of the Cold War.

With an increasing Third World presence and the failure of UN mediation in conflicts in the Middle East, Vietnam, and Kashmir, the UN increasingly shifted its attention to its ostensibly secondary goals of economic development and cultural exchange. By the 1970s, the UN budget for social and economic development was far greater than its peacekeeping budget.

Post-Cold War (1991–present) 

After the Cold War, the UN saw a radical expansion in its peacekeeping duties, taking on more missions in five years than it had in the previous four decades. Between 1988 and 2000, the number of adopted Security Council resolutions more than doubled, and the peacekeeping budget increased more than tenfold. The UN negotiated an end to the Salvadoran Civil War, launched a successful peacekeeping mission in Namibia, and oversaw democratic elections in post-apartheid South Africa and post-Khmer Rouge Cambodia. In 1991, the UN authorized a US-led coalition that repulsed the Iraqi invasion of Kuwait. Brian Urquhart, under-secretary-general from 1971 to 1985, later described the hopes raised by these successes as a "false renaissance" for the organization, given the more troubled missions that followed.

Beginning in the last decades of the Cold War, American and European critics of the UN condemned the organization for perceived mismanagement and corruption. In 1984, US President Ronald Reagan, withdrew his nation's funding from United Nations Educational, Scientific and Cultural Organization (UNESCO) over allegations of mismanagement, followed by the UK and Singapore. Boutros Boutros-Ghali, secretary-general from 1992 to 1996, initiated a reform of the Secretariat, reducing the size of the organization somewhat. His successor, Kofi Annan (1997–2006), initiated further management reforms in the face of threats from the US to withhold its UN dues.

Though the UN Charter had been written primarily to prevent aggression by one nation against another, in the early 1990s the UN faced several simultaneous, serious crises within nations such as Somalia, Haiti, Mozambique, and the former Yugoslavia. The UN mission in Somalia was widely viewed as a failure after the US withdrawal following casualties in the Battle of Mogadishu. The UN mission to Bosnia faced "worldwide ridicule" for its indecisive and confused mission in the face of ethnic cleansing. In 1994, the UN Assistance Mission for Rwanda failed to intervene in the Rwandan genocide amid indecision in the Security Council.

From the late 1990s to the early 2000s, international interventions authorized by the UN took a wider variety of forms. United Nations Security Council Resolution 1244 authorised the NATO-led Kosovo Force beginning in 1999. The UN mission (1999–2006) in the Sierra Leone Civil War was supplemented by a British military intervention. The invasion of Afghanistan in 2001 was overseen by NATO. In 2003, the United States invaded Iraq despite failing to pass a UN Security Council resolution for authorization, prompting a new round of questioning of the organization's effectiveness.

Under the eighth secretary-general, Ban Ki-moon, the UN intervened with peacekeepers in crises such as the War in Darfur in Sudan and the Kivu conflict in the Democratic Republic of Congo and sent observers and chemical weapons inspectors to the Syrian Civil War. In 2013, an internal review of UN actions in the final battles of the Sri Lankan Civil War in 2009 concluded that the organization had suffered "systemic failure". In 2010, the organization suffered the worst loss of life in its history, when 101 personnel died in the Haiti earthquake. Acting under United Nations Security Council Resolution 1973 in 2011, NATO countries intervened in the First Libyan Civil War.

The Millennium Summit was held in 2000 to discuss the UN's role in the 21st century. The three-day meeting was the largest gathering of world leaders in history, and culminated in the adoption by all member states of the Millennium Development Goals (MDGs), a commitment to achieve international development in areas such as poverty reduction, gender equality, and public health. Progress towards these goals, which were to be met by 2015, was ultimately uneven. The 2005 World Summit reaffirmed the UN's focus on promoting development, peacekeeping, human rights, and global security. The Sustainable Development Goals were launched in 2015 to succeed the Millennium Development Goals.

In addition to addressing global challenges, the UN has sought to improve its accountability and democratic legitimacy by engaging more with civil society and fostering a global constituency. In an effort to enhance transparency, in 2016 the organization held its first public debate between candidates for secretary-general. On 1 January 2017, Portuguese diplomat António Guterres, who previously served as UN High Commissioner for Refugees, became the ninth secretary-general. Guterres has highlighted several key goals for his administration, including an emphasis on diplomacy for preventing conflicts, more effective peacekeeping efforts, and streamlining the organization to be more responsive and versatile to global needs.

Structure

The United Nations is part of the broader UN System, which includes an extensive network of institutions and entities. Central to the organisation are five principal organs established by the UN Charter: the General Assembly (UNGA), the Security Council (UNSC), the Economic and Social Council (ECOSOC), the International Court of Justice (ICJ) and the UN Secretariat. A sixth principal organ, the Trusteeship Council, suspended operations on 1 November 1994, upon the independence of Palau, the last remaining UN trustee territory.

Four of the five principal organs are located at the main UN Headquarters in New York City, while the ICJ is seated in The Hague. Most other major agencies are based in the UN offices at Geneva, Vienna, and Nairobi; additional UN institutions are located throughout the world. The six official languages of the UN, used in intergovernmental meetings and documents, are Arabic, Chinese, English, French, Russian, and Spanish. On the basis of the Convention on the Privileges and Immunities of the United Nations, the UN and its agencies are immune from the laws of the countries where they operate, safeguarding the UN's impartiality with regard to host and member countries.

Below the six organs sit, in the words of the author Linda Fasulo, "an amazing collection of entities and organizations, some of which are actually older than the UN itself and operate with almost complete independence from it". These include specialized agencies, research and training institutions, programs and funds, and other UN entities.

All organisations in the UN system obey the Noblemaire principle, which calls for salaries that will attract and retain citizens of countries where compensation is highest, and which ensures equal pay for work of equal value regardless of the employee's nationality. In practice, the International Civil Service Commission, which governs the conditions of UN personnel, takes reference to the highest-paying national civil service. Staff salaries are subject to an internal tax that is administered by the UN organizations.

General Assembly

The General Assembly is the main deliberative assembly of the UN. Composed of all UN member states, the assembly meets in regular yearly sessions at the General Assembly Hall, but emergency sessions can also be called. The assembly is led by a president, elected from among the member states on a rotating regional basis, and 21 vice-presidents. The first session convened 10 January 1946 in the Methodist Central Hall in London and included representatives of 51 nations.

When the General Assembly decides on important questions such as those on peace and security, admission of new members and budgetary matters, a two-thirds majority of those present and voting is required. All other questions are decided by a majority vote. Each member country has one vote. Apart from the approval of budgetary matters, resolutions are not binding on the members. The Assembly may make recommendations on any matters within the scope of the UN, except matters of peace and security that are under consideration by the Security Council.

Draft resolutions can be forwarded to the General Assembly by its six main committees:
 First Committee (Disarmament and International Security)
 Second Committee (Economic and Financial)
 Third Committee (Social, Humanitarian, and Cultural)
 Fourth Committee (Special Political and Decolonization)
 Fifth Committee (Administrative and Budgetary)
 Sixth Committee (Legal)

As well as by the following two committees:
 General Committee – a supervisory committee consisting of the assembly's president, vice-president, and committee heads
 Credentials Committee – responsible for determining the credentials of each member nation's UN representatives

Security Council

The Security Council is charged with maintaining peace and security among countries. While other organs of the UN can only make "recommendations" to member states, the Security Council has the power to make binding decisions that member states have agreed to carry out, under the terms of Charter Article 25. The decisions of the council are known as United Nations Security Council resolutions.

The Security Council is made up of fifteen member states, consisting of five permanent members—China, France, Russia, the United Kingdom, and the United States—and ten non-permanent members elected for two-year terms by the General Assembly: Albania (term ends 2023), Brazil (2023), Gabon (2023), Ghana (2023), India (2022), Ireland (2022), Kenya (2022), Mexico (2022), Norway (2022), and the United Arab Emirates (2023). The five permanent members hold veto power over UN resolutions, allowing a permanent member to block adoption of a resolution, though not debate. The ten temporary seats are held for two-year terms, with five member states per year voted in by the General Assembly on a regional basis. The presidency of the Security Council rotates alphabetically each month.

UN Secretariat 

The UN Secretariat carries out the day-to-day duties required to operate and maintain the UN system. It is composed of tens of thousands of international civil servants worldwide and headed by the secretary-general, who is assisted by the deputy secretary-general. The Secretariat's duties include providing information and facilities needed by UN bodies for their meetings; it also carries out tasks as directed by the Security Council, the General Assembly, the Economic and Social Council, and other UN bodies.

The secretary-general acts as the de facto spokesperson and leader of the UN. The position is defined in the UN Charter as the organization's "chief administrative officer". Article 99 of the charter states that the secretary-general can bring to the Security Council's attention "any matter which in his opinion may threaten the maintenance of international peace and security", a phrase that secretaries-general since Trygve Lie have interpreted as giving the position broad scope for action on the world stage. The office has evolved into a dual role of an administrator of the UN organization and a diplomat and mediator addressing disputes between member states and finding consensus to global issues.

The secretary-general is appointed by the General Assembly, after being recommended by the Security Council, where the permanent members have veto power. There are no specific criteria for the post, but over the years it has become accepted that the position shall be held for one or two terms of five years. The current secretary-general is António Guterres of Portugal, who replaced Ban Ki-moon in 2017.

International Court of Justice

The International Court of Justice (ICJ), sometimes known as the World Court, is the primary judicial organ of the UN. It is the successor to the Permanent Court of International Justice and occupies that body's former headquarters in the Peace Palace in The Hague, Netherlands, making it the only principal organ not based in New York City. The ICJ's main function is adjudicating disputes among states; it has heard cases concerning war crimes, violations of state sovereignty, ethnic cleansing, and other issues. The court can also be called upon by other UN organs to provide advisory opinions on matters of international law. All UN member states are parties to the ICJ Statute, which forms an integral part of the UN Charter, and nonmembers may also become parties. The ICJ's rulings are binding upon parties and, along with its advisory opinions, serve as sources of international law. The court is composed of 15 judges appointed to nine-year terms by the General Assembly; every sitting judge must be from a different nation.

Economic and Social Council

The Economic and Social Council (ECOSOC) assists the General Assembly in promoting international economic, social, and humanitarian co-operation and development. It was established to serve as the UN's primary forum for global issues and is the largest and most complex UN body. ECOSOC's functions include gathering data, conducting studies, advising member nations, and making recommendations. Its work is carried out primarily by subsidiary bodies focused on a wide variety of topics; these include the United Nations Permanent Forum on Indigenous Issues, which advises UN agencies on issues relating to indigenous peoples; the United Nations Forum on Forests, which coordinates and promotes sustainable forest management; the United Nations Statistical Commission, which co-ordinates information-gathering efforts between agencies; and the Commission on Sustainable Development, which co-ordinates efforts between UN agencies and NGOs working towards sustainable development. ECOSOC may also grant consultative status to nongovernmental organizations; as of April 2021, close to 5,600 organizations have this status.

Specialized agencies

The UN Charter stipulates that each primary organ of the United Nations can establish various specialized agencies to fulfil its duties. Specialized agencies are autonomous organizations working with the United Nations and each other through the co-ordinating machinery of the Economic and Social Council. Each was integrated into the UN system through an agreement with the UN under UN Charter article 57. There are fifteen specialized agencies, which perform functions as diverse as facilitating international travel, preventing and addressing pandemics, and promoting economic development.

Funds, programmes, and other bodies 
The United Nations system includes a myriad of autonomous, separately-administered funds, programmes, research and training institutes, and other subsidiary bodies. Each of these entities have their own area of work, governance structure, and budget; several, such as the World Trade Organization (WTO) and the International Atomic Energy Agency (IAEA), operate independently of the UN but maintain formal partnership agreements. The UN performs much of its humanitarian work through these institutions, such as preventing famine and malnutrition (World Food Programme), protecting vulnerable and displaced people (UNHCR), and combating the HIV/AIDS pandemic (UNAIDS).

Membership

All the world's undisputed independent states, apart from Vatican City, are members of the United Nations. South Sudan, which joined 14 July 2011, is the most recent addition, bringing a total of  UN member states. The UN Charter outlines the membership rules:

In addition, there are two non-member observer states of the United Nations General Assembly: the Holy See (which holds sovereignty over Vatican City) and the State of Palestine. The Cook Islands and Niue, both states in free association with New Zealand, are full members of several UN specialized agencies and have had their "full treaty-making capacity" recognized by the Secretariat.

Indonesia was the first and the only nation to withdraw its membership from the United Nations, in protest to the election of Malaysia as a non-permanent member of the Security Council in 1965 during conflict between the two countries. After forming CONEFO as a short-lived rival to the UN, Indonesia resumed its full membership in 1966.

Group of 77

The Group of 77 (G77) at the UN is a loose coalition of developing nations, designed to promote its members' collective economic interests and create an enhanced joint negotiating capacity in the UN. Seventy-seven nations founded the organization, but by November 2013 the organization had since expanded to 133 member countries. The group was founded 15 June 1964 by the "Joint Declaration of the Seventy-Seven Countries" issued at the United Nations Conference on Trade and Development (UNCTAD). The group held its first major meeting in Algiers in 1967, where it adopted the Charter of Algiers and established the basis for permanent institutional structures. With the adoption of the New International Economic Order by developing countries in the 1970s, the work of the G77 spread throughout the UN system. Similar groupings of developing states also operate in other UN agencies, such as the Group of 24 (G-24), which operates in the IMF on monetary affairs.

Objectives

Peacekeeping and security

The UN, after approval by the Security Council, sends peacekeepers to regions where armed conflict has recently ceased or paused to enforce the terms of peace agreements and to discourage combatants from resuming hostilities. Since the UN does not maintain its own military, peacekeeping forces are voluntarily provided by member states. These soldiers are sometimes nicknamed "Blue Helmets" for their distinctive gear. Peacekeeping forces as a whole received the Nobel Peace Prize in 1988.

The UN has carried out 71 peacekeeping operations since 1947; as of April 2021, over 88,000 peacekeeping personnel from 121 nations were deployed on 12 missions, mostly in Africa. The largest is the United Nations Mission in South Sudan (UNMISS), which has close to 19,200 uniformed personnel; the smallest, the United Nations Military Observer Group in India and Pakistan (UNMOGIP), consists of 113 civilians and experts charged with monitoring the ceasefire in Jammu and Kashmir. UN peacekeepers with the United Nations Truce Supervision Organization (UNTSO) have been stationed in the Middle East since 1948, the longest-running active peacekeeping mission.

A study by the RAND Corporation in 2005 found the UN to be successful in two out of three peacekeeping efforts. It compared efforts at nation-building by the UN to those of the United States, and found that seven out of eight UN cases are at peace, as compared with four out of eight U.S. cases at peace. Also in 2005, the Human Security Report documented a decline in the number of wars, genocides, and human rights abuses since the end of the Cold War, and presented evidence, albeit circumstantial, that international activism—mostly spearheaded by the UN—has been the main cause of the decline in armed conflict in that period. Situations in which the UN has not only acted to keep the peace but also intervened include the Korean War (1950–53) and the authorization of intervention in Iraq after the Gulf War (1990–91). Further studies published between 2008 and 2021 determined UN peacekeeping operations to be more effective at ensuring long-lasting peace and minimizing civilian casualties.

The UN has also drawn criticism for perceived failures. In many cases, member states have shown reluctance to achieve or enforce Security Council resolutions. Disagreements in the Security Council about military action and intervention are seen as having failed to prevent the Bangladesh genocide in 1971, the Cambodian genocide in the 1970s, and the Rwandan genocide in 1994. Similarly, UN inaction is blamed for failing to either prevent the Srebrenica massacre in 1995 or complete the peacekeeping operations in 1992–93 during the Somali Civil War. UN peacekeepers have also been accused of child rape, soliciting prostitutes, and sexual abuse during various peacekeeping missions in the Democratic Republic of the Congo, Haiti, Liberia, Sudan and what is now South Sudan, Burundi, and Côte d'Ivoire. Scientists cited UN peacekeepers from Nepal as the likely source of the 2010s Haiti cholera outbreak, which killed more than 8,000 Haitians following the 2010 Haiti earthquake.

In addition to peacekeeping, the UN is also active in encouraging disarmament. Regulation of armaments was included in the writing of the UN Charter in 1945 and was envisioned as a way of limiting the use of human and economic resources for their creation. The advent of nuclear weapons came only weeks after the signing of the charter, resulting in the first resolution of the first General Assembly meeting calling for specific proposals for "the elimination from national armaments of atomic weapons and of all other major weapons adaptable to mass destruction". The UN has been involved with arms-limitation treaties, such as the Outer Space Treaty (1967), the Treaty on the Non-Proliferation of Nuclear Weapons (1968), the Seabed Arms Control Treaty (1971), the Biological Weapons Convention (1972), the Chemical Weapons Convention (1992), and the Ottawa Treaty (1997), which prohibits landmines. Three UN bodies oversee arms proliferation issues: the International Atomic Energy Agency, the Organisation for the Prohibition of Chemical Weapons, and the Comprehensive Nuclear-Test-Ban Treaty Organization Preparatory Commission. Additionally, many peacekeeping missions focus on disarmament: several operations in West Africa disarmed roughly 250,000 former combatants and secured tens of thousands of weapons and millions of munitions.

Human rights
One of the UN's primary purposes is "promoting and encouraging respect for human rights and for fundamental freedoms for all without distinction as to race, sex, language, or religion", and member states pledge to undertake "joint and separate action" to protect these rights.

In 1948, the General Assembly adopted a Universal Declaration of Human Rights, drafted by a committee headed by American diplomat and activist Eleanor Roosevelt, and including the French lawyer René Cassin. The document proclaims basic civil, political, and economic rights common to all human beings, though its effectiveness towards achieving these ends has been disputed since its drafting. The Declaration serves as a "common standard of achievement for all peoples and all nations" rather than a legally binding document, but it has become the basis of two binding treaties, the 1966 International Covenant on Civil and Political Rights and International Covenant on Economic, Social and Cultural Rights. In practice, the UN is unable to take significant action against human rights abuses without a Security Council resolution, though it does substantial work in investigating and reporting abuses.

In 1979, the General Assembly adopted the Convention on the Elimination of All Forms of Discrimination against Women, followed by the Convention on the Rights of the Child in 1989. With the end of the Cold War, the push for human rights action took on new impetus. The United Nations Commission on Human Rights was formed in 1993 to oversee human rights issues for the UN, following the recommendation of that year's World Conference on Human Rights. Jacques Fomerand, a scholar of the UN, describes this organization's mandate as "broad and vague", with only "meagre" resources to carry it out. In 2006, it was replaced by a Human Rights Council consisting of 47 nations. Also in 2006, the General Assembly passed a Declaration on the Rights of Indigenous Peoples, and in 2011 it passed its first resolution recognizing the rights of LGBT people.

Other UN bodies responsible for women's rights issues include United Nations Commission on the Status of Women, a commission of ECOSOC founded in 1946; the United Nations Development Fund for Women, created in 1976; and the United Nations International Research and Training Institute for the Advancement of Women, founded in 1979. The UN Permanent Forum on Indigenous Issues, one of three bodies with a mandate to oversee issues related to indigenous peoples, held its first session in 2002.

Economic development and humanitarian assistance

Another primary purpose of the UN is "to achieve international cooperation in solving international problems of an economic, social, cultural, or humanitarian character". Numerous bodies have been created to work towards this goal, primarily under the authority of the General Assembly and ECOSOC. In 2000, the 192 UN member states agreed to achieve eight Millennium Development Goals by 2015. The Sustainable Development Goals were launched in 2015 to succeed the Millennium Development Goals. The SDGs have an associated financing framework called the Addis Ababa Action Agenda.

The UN Development Programme (UNDP), an organization for grant-based technical assistance founded in 1945, is one of the leading bodies in the field of international development. The organization also publishes the UN Human Development Index, a comparative measure ranking countries by poverty, literacy, education, life expectancy, and other factors. The Food and Agriculture Organization (FAO), also founded in 1945, promotes agricultural development and food security. UNICEF (the United Nations Children's Fund) was created in 1946 to aid European children after the Second World War and expanded its mission to provide aid around the world and to uphold the convention on the Rights of the Child.

The World Bank Group and International Monetary Fund (IMF) are independent, specialized agencies and observers within the UN framework, according to a 1947 agreement. They were initially formed separately from the UN through the Bretton Woods Agreement in 1944. The World Bank provides loans for international development, while the IMF promotes international economic co-operation and gives emergency loans to indebted countries.

The World Health Organization (WHO), which focuses on international health issues and disease eradication, is another of the UN's largest agencies. In 1980, the agency announced that the eradication of smallpox had been completed. In subsequent decades, WHO largely eradicated polio, river blindness, and leprosy. The Joint United Nations Programme on HIV/AIDS (UNAIDS), begun in 1996, co-ordinates the organization's response to the AIDS epidemic. The UN Population Fund, which also dedicates part of its resources to combating HIV, is the world's largest source of funding for reproductive health and family planning services.

Along with the International Red Cross and Red Crescent Movement, the UN often takes a leading role in coordinating emergency relief. The World Food Programme (WFP), created in 1961, provides food aid in response to famine, natural disasters, and armed conflict. The organization reports that it feeds an average of 90 million people in 80 nations each year. The Office of the United Nations High Commissioner for Refugees (UNHCR), established in 1950, works to protect the rights of refugees, asylum seekers, and stateless people. UNHCR and WFP programmes are funded by voluntary contributions from governments, corporations, and individuals, though the UNHCR's administrative costs are paid for by the UN's primary budget.

Environment and climate 

Beginning with the formation of the UN Environmental Programme (UNEP) in 1972, the UN has made environmental issues a prominent part of its agenda. A lack of success in the first two decades of UN work in this area led to the 1992 Earth Summit in Rio de Janeiro, Brazil, which sought to give new impetus to these efforts. In 1988, the UNEP and the World Meteorological Organization (WMO), another UN organization, established the Intergovernmental Panel on Climate Change, which assesses and reports on research on global warming. The UN-sponsored Kyoto Protocol, signed in 1997, set legally binding emissions reduction targets for ratifying states.

Other global issues
Since the UN's creation, over 80 colonies have attained independence. The General Assembly adopted the Declaration on the Granting of Independence to Colonial Countries and Peoples in 1960 with no votes against but abstentions from all major colonial powers. The UN works towards decolonization through groups including the UN Committee on Decolonization, created in 1962. The committee lists seventeen remaining "non-self-governing territories", the largest and most populous of which is Western Sahara.

The UN also declares and co-ordinates international observances that bring awareness to issues of international interest or concern; examples include World Tuberculosis Day, Earth Day, and the International Year of Deserts and Desertification.

Funding

The UN budget for 2022 was $3.1 billion, not including additional resources donated by members, such as peacekeeping forces.

The UN is financed from assessed and voluntary contributions from member states. The General Assembly approves the regular budget and determines the assessment for each member. This is broadly based on the relative capacity of each country to pay, as measured by its gross national income (GNI), with adjustments for external debt and low per capita income.

The Assembly has established the principle that the UN should not be unduly dependent on any one member to finance its operations. Thus, there is a "ceiling" rate, setting the maximum amount that any member can be assessed for the regular budget. In December 2000, the Assembly revised the scale of assessments in response to pressure from the United States. As part of that revision, the regular budget ceiling was reduced from 25% to 22%. For the least developed countries (LDCs), a ceiling rate of 0.01% is applied. In addition to the ceiling rates, the minimum amount assessed to any member nation (or "floor" rate) is set at 0.001% of the UN budget ($31,000 for the two-year budget 2021–2022).

A large share of the UN's expenditure addresses its core mission of peace and security, and this budget is assessed separately from the main organizational budget. The peacekeeping budget for the 2021–2022 fiscal year is $6.38 billion, supporting 75,224 personnel deployed in 10 missions worldwide. UN peace operations are funded by assessments, using a formula derived from the regular funding scale that includes a weighted surcharge for the five permanent Security Council members, who must approve all peacekeeping operations. This surcharge serves to offset discounted peacekeeping assessment rates for less developed countries. The largest contributors to the UN peacekeeping budget for 2020–2021 are: the United States (27.89%), China (15.21%), Japan (8.56%), Germany (6.09%), the United Kingdom (5.78%), France (5.61%), Italy (3.30%), Russia (3.04%), Canada (2.73%), and South Korea (2.26%).

Special UN programmes not included in the regular budget, such as UNICEF and the World Food Programme, are financed by voluntary contributions from member governments, corporations, and private individuals.

Evaluations, awards, and criticism

Evaluations
In evaluating the UN as a whole, Jacques Fomerand writes that the "accomplishments of the United Nations in the last 60 years are impressive in their own terms. Progress in human development during the 20th century has been dramatic, and the UN and its agencies have certainly helped the world become a more hospitable and livable place for millions". Evaluating the first 50 years of the UN's history, the author Stanley Meisler writes that "the United Nations never fulfilled the hopes of its founders, but it accomplished a great deal nevertheless", citing its role in decolonization and its many successful peacekeeping efforts.

British historian Paul Kennedy states that while the organization has suffered some major setbacks, "when all its aspects are considered, the UN has brought great benefits to our generation and ... will bring benefits to our children's and grandchildren's generations as well."

Then French President François Hollande stated in 2012 that "France trusts the United Nations. She knows that no state, no matter how powerful, can solve urgent problems, fight for development and bring an end to all crises ... France wants the UN to be the centre of global governance". In his 1953 address to the United States Committee for United Nations Day, U.S. President Dwight D. Eisenhower expressed the view that, for all its flaws, "the United Nations represents man's best organized hope to substitute the conference table for the battlefield".

UN peacekeeping missions are assessed to be generally successful. An analysis of 47 peace operations by Virginia Page Fortna of Columbia University found that UN-led conflict resolution usually resulted in long-term peace. Political scientists Hanne Fjelde, Lisa Hultman and Desiree Nilsson of Uppsala University studied twenty years of data on peacekeeping missions, including in Lebanon, the Democratic Republic of the Congo, and the Central African Republic, concluding that they were more effective at reducing civilian casualties than counterterrorism operations by nation states. Georgetown University professor Lise Howard postulates that UN peacekeeping operations are more effective due to their emphasis on "verbal persuasion, financial inducements and coercion short of offensive military force, including surveillance and arrest", which are likelier to change the behavior of warring parties.

Awards
A number of agencies and individuals associated with the UN have won the Nobel Peace Prize in recognition of their work. Two secretaries-general, Dag Hammarskjöld and Kofi Annan, were each awarded the prize (in 1961 and 2001, respectively), as were Ralph Bunche (1950), a UN negotiator, René Cassin (1968), a contributor to the Universal Declaration of Human Rights, and the US Secretary of State Cordell Hull (1945), the latter for his role in the organization's founding. Lester B. Pearson, the Canadian Secretary of State for External Affairs, was awarded the prize in 1957 for his role in organizing the UN's first peacekeeping force to resolve the Suez Crisis. UNICEF won the prize in 1965, the International Labour Organization in 1969, the UN Peacekeeping Forces in 1988, the International Atomic Energy Agency (which reports to the UN) in 2005, and the UN-supported Organisation for the Prohibition of Chemical Weapons in 2013. The UN High Commissioner for Refugees was awarded in 1954 and 1981, becoming one of only two recipients to win the prize twice. The UN as a whole was awarded the prize in 2001, sharing it with Annan. In 2007, IPCC received the prize "for their efforts to build up and disseminate greater knowledge about man-made climate change, and to lay the foundations for the measures that are needed to counteract such change."

Criticism

Role

In a sometimes-misquoted statement, U.S. President George W. Bush stated in February 2003—referring to UN uncertainty towards Iraqi provocations under the Saddam Hussein regime—that "free nations will not allow the UN to fade into history as an ineffective, irrelevant debating society."

In 2020, former U.S. President Barack Obama, in his memoir A Promised Land noted, "In the middle of the Cold War, the chances of reaching any consensus had been slim, which is why the U.N. had stood idle as Soviet tanks rolled into Hungary or U.S. planes dropped napalm on the Vietnamese countryside. Even after the Cold War, divisions within the Security Council continued to hamstring the U.N.'s ability to tackle problems. Its member states lacked either the means or the collective will to reconstruct failing states like Somalia, or prevent an ethnic slaughter in places like Sri Lanka."

Since its founding, there have been many calls for reform of the UN but little consensus on how to do so. Some want the UN to play a greater or more effective role in world affairs, while others want its role reduced to humanitarian work.

Representation and structure
Core features of the UN apparatus, such as the veto privileges of some nations in the Security Council, are often described as fundamentally undemocratic, contrary to the UN mission, and a main cause of inaction on genocides and crimes against humanity.

Jacques Fomerand states the most enduring divide in views of the UN is "the North–South split" between richer Northern nations and developing Southern nations. Southern nations tend to favour a more empowered UN with a stronger General Assembly, allowing them a greater voice in world affairs, while Northern nations prefer an economically laissez-faire UN that focuses on transnational threats such as terrorism.

There have also been numerous calls for the UN Security Council's membership to be increased, for different ways of electing the UN's secretary-general, and for a UN Parliamentary Assembly.

Exclusion of countries
After World War II, the French Committee of National Liberation was late to be recognized by the U.S. as the government of France, and so the country was initially excluded from the conferences that created the new organization. Future French president Charles de Gaulle criticized the UN, famously calling it a machin ("contraption"), and was not convinced that a global security alliance would help maintain world peace, preferring direct defence treaties between countries.

Since 1971, the Republic of China (ROC), or Taiwan, has been excluded from the UN and consistently denied membership in its reapplications; Taiwanese citizens are also barred from entering UN facilities with ROC passports. The UN officially adheres to the "One China" policy endorsed by most member states, which recognizes the People's Republic of China (PRC), a permanent member of the UN Security Council, as the only legitimate Chinese government. Critics allege that this position reflects a failure of the organization's development goals and guidelines, and it garnered renewed scrutiny during the COVID-19 pandemic, when Taiwan was denied membership in the World Health Organization despite its relatively effective response to the virus. Support for Taiwan's inclusion is subject to pressure from the PRC, which regards the territories administered by the ROC as their own territory.

Independence
Throughout the Cold War, both the US and USSR repeatedly accused the UN of favouring the other. In 1950, the USSR boycotted the organization in protest to China's seat at the UN Security Council being given to the anticommunist government of the Republic of China. Three years later, the Soviets effectively forced the resignation of UN Secretary-General Trygve Lie by refusing to acknowledge his administration due to his support of the Korean War.

Ironically, the US had simultaneously scrutinized the UN for employing communists and Soviet sympathizers, following a high-profile accusation that Alger Hiss, an American who had taken part in the establishment of the UN, had been a Soviet spy. US Senator Joseph McCarthy claimed that the UN Secretariat under Secretary-General Lie harbored American communists, leading to further pressure that the UN chief resign. The US saw nascent opposition to the UN into the 1960s, particularly among political conservatives, with groups such as the John Birch Society alleging that the organization was an instrument for communism. Popular opposition to the UN was expressed through bumper stickers and signs with slogans such as "Get the U.S. out of the U.N. and the U.N. out of the U.S.!" and "You can't spell communism without U.N."

National sovereignty
In the United States, there were concerns about supposed threats to national sovereignty, most notably promoted by the John Birch Society, which mounted a nationwide campaign in opposition to the UN during the 1960s.

Beginning in the 1990s, the same concern appeared with the American Sovereignty Restoration Act, which has been introduced multiple times in the United States Congress. In 1997, an amendment containing the bill received a floor vote, with 54 representatives voting in favor. The 2007 version of the bill was authored by U.S. Representative Ron Paul, Republican of the 14th district of Texas, to effect U.S. withdrawal from the United Nations. It would repeal various laws pertaining to the UN, terminate authorization for funds to be spent on the UN, terminate UN presence on U.S. property, and withdraw diplomatic immunity for UN employees. It would provide up to two years for the U.S. to withdraw. The Yale Law Journal cited the Act as proof that "the United States’s complaints against the United Nations have intensified." The most recent iteration, as of 2022, is H.R.7806, introduced by Rep. Mike D. Rogers.

Bias
The UN's attention to Israel's treatment of Palestinians is considered excessive by a range of critics, including Israeli diplomat Dore Gold, British scholar Robert S. Wistrich, American legal scholar Alan Dershowitz, Australian politician Mark Dreyfus, and the Anti-Defamation League. In September 2015, Saudi Arabia's Faisal bin Hassan Trad was elected chair of an advisory committee in the UN Human Rights Council that appoints independent experts, a move criticized by human rights groups. The UNHRC has likewise been accused of anti-Israel bias, as it has passed more resolutions condemning Israel than the rest of the world combined.

Effectiveness 
According to international relations scholar Edward Luck, former director of the Center on International Organization of the School of International and Public Affairs of Columbia University, the United States has preferred a feeble United Nations in major projects undertaken by the organization to forestall UN interference with, or resistance to, American policies. "The last thing the U.S. wants is an independent U.N. throwing its weight around," Luck said. Similarly, former US Ambassador to the United Nations Daniel Patrick Moynihan explained that "The Department of State desired that the United Nations prove utterly ineffective in whatever measures it undertook. The task was given to me, and I carried it forward with not inconsiderable success."

In 1994, former special representative of the secretary-general of the UN to Somalia Mohamed Sahnoun published Somalia: The Missed Opportunities, a book in which he analyses the reasons for the failure of the 1992 UN intervention in Somalia. Sahnoun claims that between the start of the Somali civil war in 1988 and the fall of the Siad Barre regime in January 1991, the UN missed at least three opportunities to prevent major human tragedies; when the UN tried to provide humanitarian assistance, they were totally outperformed by NGOs, whose competence and dedication sharply contrasted with the UN's excessive caution and bureaucratic inefficiencies. Sahnoun warned that if radical reform were not undertaken, then the UN would continue to respond to such crises with inept improvisation.

Beyond specific instances or areas of alleged ineffectiveness, some scholars debate the overall effectiveness of the UN. Adherents to the realist school of international relations take a pessimistic position, arguing that the UN is not an effective organization because it is dominated and constrained by great powers. Liberal scholars counter that it is an effective organization because it has proved capable of solving many problems by working around the restrictions imposed by powerful member states. The UN is generally considered by scholars to be more effective in realms such as public health, humanitarian assistance, and conflict resolution.

Inefficiency and corruption
Critics have also accused the UN of bureaucratic inefficiency, waste, and corruption. In 1976, the General Assembly established the Joint Inspection Unit to seek out inefficiencies within the UN system. During the 1990s, the US withheld dues citing inefficiency and only started repayment on the condition that a major reforms initiative be introduced. In 1994, the Office of Internal Oversight Services (OIOS) was established by the General Assembly to serve as an efficiency watchdog.

In 2004, the UN faced accusations that its recently ended Oil-for-Food Programme—in which Iraq had been allowed to trade oil for basic needs to relieve the pressure of sanctions—had suffered from widespread corruption, including billions of dollars of kickbacks. An independent inquiry created by the UN found that many of its officials had been involved in the scheme, and raised "significant" questions about the role of Kojo Annan, the son of Kofi Annan.

Model United Nations

The United Nations has inspired the extracurricular activity Model United Nations (MUN). MUN is a simulation of United Nations activity based on the UN agenda and following UN procedure. It is usually attended by high school and university students who organize conferences to simulate the various UN committees to discuss important issues of the day. Today, MUN educates tens of thousands on the activities of the UN around the world. MUN has many famous and notable alumni, such as former UN Secretary-General Ban Ki-moon.

See also

Notes

References

Citations

Bibliography

Further reading

 
 Mazower, Mark (2009). No Enchanted Palace: The End of Empire and the Ideological Origins of the United Nations. Princeton University Press.

External links 

 Records of the UN Registry at the United Nations Archives

Official websites 
  
 The United Nations Regional Information Centre (UNRIC)
 United Nations Volunteers
 United Nations Documentation Research Guide
 Official YouTube channel (English)

Others
 Searchable archive of UN discussions and votes
 United Nations Association of the UK – independent policy authority on the UN
 Website of the Global Policy Forum – independent think tank on the UN
 UN Watch – NGO monitoring UN activities
 UN Coronavirus page
  United Nations COVID-19 Statement
 
 
 

 
Intergovernmental organizations established by treaty
Organizations awarded Nobel Peace Prizes
Organizations based in New York City
Organizations established in 1945
1945 establishments in the United States
Peace organizations
Sakharov Prize laureates